Alpha Air is a defunct regional airline based in Los Angeles.

History 
Alpha Air was founded in 1984 with base Van Nuys Airport and operated flights between Bishop and Mammoth Lakes from Los Angeles with a Cessna 402. Alpha Air was the first scheduled airline to fly to Bishop which previously had no scheduled airline service. In 1985 Alpha Air moved its hub to LAX to serve the more demand of passengers. The airline then added routes to Lake Havasu City, Laughlin/Bullhead City and Oakland.

The airline continued to serve this route network until 1987 when the airline attempted to buy the operating certificate of the recianty bankrupt Royal West Airlines. The airline failed to purchase the certificate and in late 1987 the airline added routes to San Jose and Inyokern. In 1988 Alpha Air added "tourist" services to the  Grand Canyon from LAX. The airline then leased two Beechcraft 1900Cs, and they were delivered on the second March 1990. The airline utilized the Beechcrafts on local services from LAX to Santa Catalina Islands and Big Bear Lake.

In 1991 the airline began a codeshare with Luxury carrier, MGM Grand Air and formed Grand Connection utilizing a leased de Havilland Twin Otter. Grand Connection began to operate services from Los Angeles to Orange County. This service was aimed at business clients in the Orange County. By the end of the year the contract between MGM Grand Air and Alpha Air was terminated. The airline continued to add services and in 1992 added Burbank, Orange County and South Lake Tahoe to the network. In 1993 after many negotiations, the airline became a full TWExpress carrier and continued to operated there network under the TWA brand. By 1994 the route network consisted of Burbank, Los Angeles and Orange County to both Mammoth Lakes and South Lake Tahoe, as well as a single flight to the Grand Canyon. The airline suffered during TWA's first bankruptcy in1992 and during the TWA bankruptcy in 1995 the airline itself filed for bankruptcy in September and had all of its aircraft repossessed.

Destinations 
This is a list of Alpha Air's destinations throughout its existence:

Alpha Air Proper 

 Los Angeles (LAX) - Hub
 Bishop (BIH)
 Mammoth Lakes (MMH)
 Lake Havasu City (HII)
 Laughlin/Bullhead City (IFP)
 Oakland (OAK)
 San Jose (SJC)
 Inyokern (IYK)
 Santa Catalina Islands (AVX)
 Big Bear Lake (RBF)
 Orange County (SNA)
 Burbank (BUR)
 South Lake Tahoe (TVL)
 Grand Canyon (GCN)

As TWExpress 

 Los Angeles (LAX) - Hub
 Burbank (BUR)
 Orange County (SNA)
 Mammoth Lakes (MMH)
 South Lake Tahoe (TVL)

Fleet 

The fleet of Alpha Air consisted of:

 3 Beechcraft 1900Cs
 1 Cessna 402
1 de Havilland Twin Otter (as Grand Connection)

See also 

 List of Defunct Airlines of the United States

References 

Defunct airlines of the United States
Airlines established in 1976
Airlines disestablished in 1995
Trans World Airlines
Airlines based in California